Donlevy is a surname of Irish origin, spelled variously as MacDonlevy, Donleavy and Dunleavy among others. It derives from the Irish Mac Duinnshléibhe, meaning "son of Donn of the mountain". Ó Duinnshléibhe is a variant Irish spelling.

History 
The family's eponymous ancestor is Donn Sléibe mac Echdacha, who ruled as king of the Irish petty-kingdom of Dál Fiatach, as well as its over-kingdom, Ulaid, in the late 10th century. In the aftermath of John de Courcy's conquest of Ulaid in 1177, some of the dynasty migrated to present-day County Donegal, whilst others went to Scotland. In Donegal they became the hereditary physicians (Old Irish: ollahm leighis) of the Cenél Conaill of Tír Conaill.

After the Battle of Kinsale in 1602, the sept migrated to the province of Connacht, where their name is now most common. Some MacDonlevys in Donegal adopted the surname Mac an Ultaigh, meaning "son of the Ulsterman", which was anglicised as McNulty.

Notable people

Donlevy
Andrew Donlevy (born 1694), Irish Roman Catholic priest.
Brian Donlevy (1889–1972), American actor.
Cormac MacDonlevy (fl. c. 1460), Irish physician and medical scholar
Frank Donlevy (born 1932), Scottish footballer
Jim Donlevy (1937–2019), Canadian football coach

Donleavy
J. P. Donleavy (1926–2017), American writer

Dunleavy
Chris Dunleavy (born 1949), English footballer
Dan Dunleavy (born 1965), Canadian sportscaster
Jack Dunleavy (1879–1944), American baseball player
John Dunleavy (born 1991), Irish footballer
Mary Dunleavy, American opera singer
 A family of American basketball people:
 Mike Dunleavy Sr. (born 1954), player and coach
 Mike Dunleavy Jr. (born 1980), older son, player
 Baker Dunleavy (born 1982), younger son, coach
Mike J. Dunleavy (born 1961), American politician, Governor of Alaska since 2018
Patrick Dunleavy (born 1952), British political scientist
Philip Dunleavy (1915–1996), Welsh politician
Richard Dunleavy (born 1933), American naval officer
Rosemary Dunleavy, American ballerina
Steve Dunleavy (1938–2019), Australian journalist
Joe Dunleavy (1998) Rugby player

Dunlevy
 Pearl Dunlevy (1909–2002), Irish doctor

Mac Duinnshléibhe
Cormac Mac Duinnshléibhe, a fifteenth-century Irish physician and scribe
Suibhne mac Duinnshléibhe, a thirteenth-century Scottish magnate

Ó Duinnshléibhe
 Donnchadh mac Eoghan Ó Duinnshléibhe, Irish physician d. 1528.
 Muiris mac Donnchadh Ulltach Ó Duinnshléibhe, Irish cleric, fl. 1602–1630s
 Muiris mac Seaán Ulltach Ó Duinnshléibhe, Irish cleric, fl. 1602–1630s.

List of Mac Duinn Sléibe kings of Ulaid

Donn Sléibe mac Eochada 1081–1091, the eponymous ancestor of the Mac Duinn Sléibe dynasty.
Donnchad mac Duinn Sléibe 1091–1095
Eochaid mac Duinn Sléibe 1095–1099
Donnchad mac Duinn Sléibe 1099–1099
Eochaid mac Duinn Sléibe 1099–1108
Donnchad mac Duinn Sléibe 1108–1113
Áed mac Duinn Sléibe 1113–1127
Cú Ulad mac Conchobair Chisenaig Mac Duinn Sléibe 1131–1157
Áed mac Con Ulad Mac Duinn Sléibe 1157–1158
Eochaid mac Con Ulad Mac Duinn Sléibe 1158–1166
Magnus mac Con Ulad Mac Duinn Sléibe 1166–1171
Donn Sléibe mac Con Ulad Mac Duinn Sléibe 1171–1172
Ruaidrí mac Con Ulad Mac Duinn Sléibe 1172–1201
Cu-Ulahd Mac Duinn Sléibe (fl. c. 1178)

List of physicians
Muiris MacDonlevy (died 1395) is the first member entered in the Irish Annals where they are listed as ollahm lieghis chenel Conaill, the physician to the Cenel Conaill, the ruling dynasty of Tír Conaill.
By his agnomens Paul Ultach or Paul the Ulidian, Muiris's father is also mentioned at this 1395 A.D. entry to be physician who flourished both before and after Muiris.
Murtough Ultaigh Donlevy is recorded as being a physician under an entry for 1497.
Donnell Ultaigh Donlevy the son of an unnamed Ultaigh “ollav” to the O’Donnell in Tir Chonaill, is recorded as having been slain in the year 1567.
Donnchadh mac Eoghan Ó Duinnshléibhe (Donnchadh MacDonlevy), M.D. is recorded as a physician. Donnchadh was educated on the continent at Paris. 
Eoghan MacDonlevy, M.D. or Owen Ultach (died 1586) was the son of Donnchadh and also educated at Paris. Considered throughout Ireland and much of Europe as the finest physician of his time, with his skills are not only recounted by the Irish Annals and at the Dictionary of National Biography but also by Stanihurst.
Cormac MacDonlevy (fl. c. 1460) was an influential medieval Irish physician and medical scholar, who advanced Irish medieval medical practice by, for the first time, translating seminal continental European medical texts from Latin to vernacular. His translations provided the then exclusively Gaelic language speaking majority of Irish physicians with their first reference access to these texts.

The Annals note further that the branch of the MacDonlevy, who had been the physicians, still existed near Kilmacrenan, County Donegal in the early 17th century.

Tradition is that the MacDonlevy physicians educated in the medical arts Tír Conaill native Niall Ó Glacáin (Latinised as Nellanus Glacanus). Glacanus became a famed physician, professor of medicine and medical researcher at the University of Bologna.

See also
 Levy
 McNulty
 Kings of Ulster
 Dál Fiatach
 Ulaid
 Irish medical families
 Donn (Irish mythology)

References

Bibliography
 
 
</ref>
</ref>

Surnames of Irish origin
Anglicised Irish-language surnames
Irish families
Irish royal families
Irish medical families